The  is a skyscraper located in Shinjuku, Tokyo, Japan. It was built by the Japanese construction firm, Shimizu Construction Company.

References 
https://www.emporis.com/buildings/105047/shinjuku-l-tower-tokyo-japan

Skyscrapers in Shinjuku

Office buildings completed in 1989